Bervie Water is a river in Aberdeenshire, Scotland which rises in the Drumtochty Forest and flows across The Mearns to reach the North Sea at Inverbervie.  Approximately two kilometres upstream of the North Sea, the Bervie Water flows through the grounds of Allardice Castle.  The Bothenoth Burn (Burn of Healing) joins the Bervie Water to the east of Arbuthnott House. At Arbuthnott the river forms a steep-sided valley where gardens were laid out on the south-facing slope. It is a series of four terraces across which run diagonal intersecting grass paths.

See also
Carron Water, Aberdeenshire

Rivers of Aberdeenshire